Shin Sang-ok (born Shin Tae-seo; October 11, 1926 – April 11, 2006) was a South Korean filmmaker with more than 100 producer and 70 director credits to his name. His best-known films were made in the 1950s and 60s, many of them collaborations with his wife Choi Eun-hee, when he was known as "The Prince of South Korean Cinema". He received posthumously the Gold Crown Cultural Medal, the country's top honor for an artist. 

In 1978, Shin and Choi were kidnapped by North Korean leader, Kim Jong-il, for the purpose of producing critically acclaimed films. The two remained in captivity for 8 years until 1986, when they escaped and sought asylum in the United States. Shin continued to produce and direct films in America, now under the pseudonym "Simon Sheen", before eventually returning to South Korea for his final years.

Early life
The son of a prominent doctor of Korean medicine, Shin was born Shin Tae-seo was born in Chongjin, in the northeastern part of the Korean Peninsula, at the time occupied by Japan and currently a part of North Korea. Shin studied in Japan at Tokyo Fine Arts School, the predecessor of Tokyo National University of Fine Arts and Music, before returning to Korea three years later.

Shin started his film career as an assistant production designer on Choi In-kyu's Viva Freedom!, the first Korean film made after the country achieved independence from Japan. During the "Golden Age" of South Korean cinema in the late 1950s and 1960s, Shin worked prolifically, often directing two or more films per year, earning the nickname the "Prince of South Korean Cinema". Shin featured the Western princess, female sex workers for American soldiers, in The Evil Night (1952) and A Flower in Hell (1958). The production company he started, Shin Films, produced around 300 films during the 1960s, including Prince Yeonsan (1961), the winner of the Best Film prize at the first Grand Bell Awards ceremony and a Grand Bell Award-winning 1964 remake of Na Woon-gyu's 1926 Beongeoli Sam-ryong.

During the 1970s, Shin became less active, while South Korea's cinema industry in general suffered under strict censorship and constant government interference. Most of the films he directed during this period ended up being flops.

North Korean period (1978–1986)

In 1978, Shin's former wife, Choi Eun-hee, an actress who starred in many of his films, was kidnapped in Hong Kong and taken to North Korea. Shin himself came under suspicion of causing her disappearance and when he traveled to Hong Kong to investigate, he was kidnapped as well. The kidnappings were on orders of future leader Kim Jong-il, who wanted to establish a film industry for his country to sway international opinion regarding the views of the Workers' Party of Korea. The North Korean authorities have denied the kidnapping accusations, claiming that Shin came to the country willingly. Shin and Choi made secret audiotapes of conversations with Kim Jong-il, which supported their story.
 
Shin was put in comfortable accommodation, but after two escape attempts was placed in a prison for over two years. Once his re-education in North Korean ideology was thought complete, he was taken to Pyongyang in 1983 to meet Kim Jong-il and learn why he had been abducted to North Korea. His ex-wife was brought to the same dinner party, where she first learned that Shin was also in North Korea. They remarried shortly afterwards, as suggested by Kim Jong-il.

From 1983 on, Shin directed seven films, with Kim Jong-il acting as an executive producer. The last and best-known of these films is Pulgasari, a giant-monster film similar to the Japanese Godzilla. In 1986, eight years after his kidnapping, Shin and his wife escaped while in Vienna for a film festival. They managed to obtain political asylum from the US embassy in Vienna and Kim Jong-il became convinced that the couple had been kidnapped by the Americans. Shin and his wife lived covertly for two years in Reston, Virginia, under American protection and authorities debriefed the couple about Kim Jong-il and their experience in North Korea.

Later career (1986–2006)
Shin and his wife moved to Los Angeles, where he worked in the 1990s under the pseudonym Simon Sheen, directing 3 Ninjas Knuckle Up and working as an executive producer for 3 Ninjas Kick Back and 3 Ninjas: High Noon at Mega Mountain.

At first, Shin was reluctant to go back to South Korea, because he feared that the government's security police would not believe the kidnapping story; he eventually returned to South Korea permanently in 1994 and continued to work on new movies. The same year, he was invited to the Cannes Film Festival as a jury member. His last movie as a director was an unreleased 2002 film called Kyeoul-iyagi (The Story of Winter).

In 2004, Shin underwent a liver transplant. He died of complications caused by hepatitis two years later. At the time of his death he was planning a musical about Genghis Khan. South Korean President Roh Moo-hyun posthumously awarded Shin the Gold Crown Cultural Medal on April 12, 2006, the country's top honor for an artist.

In media 

In 2015, an English language biography of his life (along with Choi Eun-hee), called A Kim Jong-Il Production: The Extraordinary True Story of a Kidnapped Filmmaker, was published by Paul Fischer.

In January 2016, at the 2016 Sundance Film Festival, in the World Cinema Documentary Competition, a documentary about the North Korean ordeal, entitled The Lovers and the Despot and directed by Robert Cannan and Ross Adam, was presented.

In 2017, BBC Radio 4 broadcast a drama Lights, Camera, Kidnap!, based on Shin's ordeal, written by Lucy Catherine, directed by Sasha Yevtushenko, and starring Paul Courtenay Hyu as Shin and Liz Sutherland as Choi.

Works

Filmography
Partial filmography as director:
 A Flower in Hell (1958)
 To the Last Day (1960)
 Prince Yeonsan (1961)
 Seong Chun-hyang (1961)
 The Houseguest and My Mother (1961)
 The Memorial Gate for Virtuous Women (1962)
 Rice (1963)
 Red Scarf (1964)
 Deaf Sam-yong (1964)
 Phantom Queen (1967)
 Prince Daewon (1968)
 Ghosts of Chosun (1970)
 A Woman with Half Soul (1973)
 The Three-Day Reign (1973)
 At 13 Years Old (1974)
 An Emissary of No Return (1984)
 Runaway (1984)
 Love, Love, My Love (1985)
 Salt (1985)
 The Tale of Shim Chong (1985)
 Pulgasari (1985)
 Breakwater (1985)
 Mayumi (1990)
 Vanished (1994)
 3 Ninjas Knuckle Up (1995)

Writer
 Galgameth (1996)

Bibliography

See also
North Korean abductions of South Koreans

References

Works cited

Further reading

External links
 

The Korea Society Film Journal: Review of "Flowers of Hell"

1926 births
2006 deaths
Deaths from hepatitis
South Korean film directors
People from Chongjin
Kidnapped South Korean people
Liver transplant recipients
North Korean abductions
Best Director Paeksang Arts Award (film) winners
Sin clan of Pyongsan
Horror film directors